Sud Kola (also Romanized as Sūd Kolā) is a village in Banaft Rural District, Dodangeh District, Sari County, Mazandaran Province, Iran. At the 2006 census, its population was 132, in 41 families.

References 

Populated places in Sari County